Kalyan Roy, also credited as Kalyan Shankar Roy  (27 December 1929 - 31 January 1985) was an Indian politician and a leader of Communist Party of India and also a leader of All India Trade Union Congress. One of the famous trade union leaders of Asansol-Raniganj coalfield area, Kalyan Roy was one of the senior  CPI leader and parliamentarian in Rajya Sabha.

Family background and education 

Kalyan Roy was born to the freedom fighter, Congress leader and former Home Minister of West Bengal Kiran Shankar Roy and Padma Roy (née Roy Chowdhury) on 27 December 1929 in Calcutta, India.

Political Life 

Since the end of 1945, many changes took place when the leadership of the Indian Trade Union movement had fallen to the Communists and the followers of M.N.Roy. In 1946 Trade Union membership tripled and the Congress party, leader of Trade Union movement in the early twenties, was in a dominating position. After 7 years in 1953, according to the Lok Sabha speech of Deputy labour Minister Abid Ali, then in India 4 Trade Unions: INTUC, AITUC, HMS and UTUC had a major influence on the workers. At that time, Colliery Mazdoor Sabha and Indian Mine Workers Federation led by AITUC leader Kalyan Roy, had a stronghold in India's oldest coal belt in Raniganj area.

Bengali Bhadralok Pranab Mukherjee, an active Congress leader in the 1970s and senior communist leaders like Kalyan Ray shared a close association though their ideological views were different.

Coal Belt Review 1958- General Secretary of Indian Mine Workers’ Federation, Kalyan Roy expressed his views in his article, Coal Belt in 1958—A Review for the 'Crisis and Workers Report to AITUC General Council' in 1959. He ended the article by saying, 
"both the Indian Mine Workers Federation and the Indian National Mine Workers Federation have come out with more or less similar demands. The conferences of the iMWF at Bhurkunda and inmwf at Dhanbad have raised the slogans of: Nationalisation of Mines, Wage Board for Coal Industry, Abolition of Contract labour; Gratuity and change in the present Bonus Act."

Kalyan Roy was elected in the year 1969, 1975 and 1982 Rajya Sabha elections as a CPI leader from West Bengal.

  
 The Mines (Amendment) Bill, 1972- Kalyan Roy was a member of a 45-member joint parliamentary committee, Government of India. The committee consists of 30 members from Lok Sabha and 15 members from Rajya Sabha. After the twenty-sixth sitting on 27th August 1973, the report of the committee was tabled in Rajya Sabha on 30 August 1973.

 Chasnala Mining Disaster 1975  - Indira Gandhi declared The Emergency on 25 June 1975. The coal miners across the country faced the worst workable conditions led to the Chasnala mining disaster on 27 December 1975. 375 miners were killed in the disaster.

The miners blamed The Indian Iron and Steel Company (IISCO) the then-owner of Chasnala Colliery for mismanagement and negligence. The Indian Iron and Steel Company (IISCO) claimed that International standards are maintained in Chasnala Colliery.

On 16 January 1976 in a debate titled corruption in The Indian Iron and Steel Company (IISCO) in West Bengal, Rajya Sabha MP Kalyan Roy asked the Union Minister of Steel and Mines that whether he knows 
the rampant corruption in the Indian Iron and Steel Company at Burnpur and Kulti in West Bengal; Roy also asked the Minister what administrative measures have been taken to stop this corruption? what steps have been taken so far against the corrupt officers and contractors? and what is the amount of money paid to each of the contractors in Burnpur and Kulti as .well as in Chasnala and Jitpur coal mines in 1974 and 1975?

According to the former journalist and political commentator Rajeev Shukla, Roy was one of the very few leaders who set a benchmark for the institution as a parliamentarian.

Death 

Roy died in Calcutta on 31 January 1985 when he was only 55 years old. Gurudas Dasgupta was elected to the Rajya Sabha in the vacancy caused by the death of Kalyan Roy.

Roy was then a sitting member of Rajya Sabha when on On 31 January 1985, after the House passed the Constitution (Fifty-second Amendment) Bill, 1985, the Deputy Chairman, Najma Heptulla announced the passing away of Kalyan Roy at Kolkata and made obituary references about him.

References  

1929 births
1985 deaths
People from Kolkata
Rajya Sabha members from West Bengal
Communist Party of India politicians from West Bengal
 Syracuse University alumni
 Bengali communists
 Politicians from Kolkata
 20th-century Indian politicians
 Indian trade union leaders
 Trade unionists from West Bengal
 All India Trade Union Congress
 Labour movement in India
 Communism in India
 Communist parties in India
 Communist Party of India politicians
 Communists
 Marxism–Leninism